Live in New York & Dublin is a live EP released by the Irish musician Rob Smith on 9 June 2011. It features acoustic live performances in various venues in both New York City, United States and Dublin, Ireland.

Track listing
 "Stand Up"
 "Elephant Stone"
 "Laugh All the Way to Town"
 "So Many So Near"
 "Rue Sainte-Dominique"
 "Out in the Sunshine"
 "(People) Come with Me"

References 

2011 debut EPs
Rob Smith (Irish musician) albums